Hemidactylus tanganicus, also known as the Tanzania leaf-toed gecko, Tanzanian diamond gecko or Dutumi gecko,  is a species of gecko. It is endemic to Tanzania.

References

Hemidactylus
Endemic fauna of Tanzania
Reptiles of Tanzania
Reptiles described in 1929
Taxa named by Arthur Loveridge